Dorcadion petrovitzi is a species of beetle in the family Cerambycidae. It was described by Heyrovský in 1964. It is known from Turkey.

References

petrovitzi
Beetles described in 1964